Diabeł (English: The Devil) is a 1972 Polish historical film with elements of horror written and directed by Andrzej Żuławski. Released in 1972, it was banned by the Communist government in Poland.

Plot
The movie opens in the midst of the Prussian invasion of Poland in the 1790s. A Stranger clad in black (Wojciech Pszoniak) enters a prison where Jakub (Leszek Teleszyński) is being held on charges that he tried to assassinate the king as part of a conspiracy. The Stranger frees Jakub in the midst of a riot, tells him to return home, and sends a white-clad nun named Zakonnica (Monika Niemczyk) to accompany Jakub. Zakonnica appears to be a representation of goodness/God and the Stranger a representation of evil/the Devil. Through most of the movie, Zakonnica remains in a state of stunned horror at the things she and Jakub witness.

Along the way, Jakub (who is constantly followed by the Stranger) encounters a hedonistic group of actors, all of whom wish to seduce him. He finds that his best friend and co-conspirator told Jakub's pregnant fiancée that Jakub was killed and has married her instead (it also appears that Jakub's friend is now working for the King). Jakub returns home to find that his father committed suicide and his sister has gone mad. The household is being run by his half-brother, who mocks Jakub's cause and intends to marry Jakub's sister (whom he mercilessly beats). Jakub also learns that his mother (who abandoned Jakub and his sister as children) actually has lived close by their entire lives, running a bordello. He confronts his mother at the bordello (the mother does not appear to recognize Jakub) where they almost sleep together (intra-family sexual taboos are a theme throughout the film: the sister is betrothed to her half-brother and was seemingly raped by their father after the father went insane; and Jakub appears to have romantic feelings for his mom and sister). Jakub  takes out his rage on a prostitute in the bordello, slitting her throat with a straight razor given to him by the Stranger.

Repulsed by his actions, Jakub seeks comfort from Zakonnica, but she pushes him away. Jakub appears to go mad. He returns to his friend's castle to try and reunite with his fiancée, only to be beaten (and then, kissed) by his former best friend. He is found by the acting troupe and is seduced by one of the actresses. In mid-coitus, he is attacked by another actor out of jealousy. Jakub kills the actor and actress and is pursued by the remaining troupe. The leader of the troupe (a man) tries to sleep with Jakub in exchange for not turning him in to the authorities, eventually trying to rape Jakub. The Stranger shows up and saves Jakub by killing the leader of the troupe. Zakonnica and Jakub journey to a place Jakub played as a child to find his ex-fiancée there. She expresses a wish to run away with Jakub, but then passes away due to complications with her pregnancy (and passes away despite Jakub pleading with Zakonnica to save her). The Stranger then has Jakub return to his mother's bordello.

The mother embraces Jakub (now knowing who he is) and takes him to the basement where the denizens are engaged in all manner of hedonistic actions. She says he can stay with her as a prostitute, where people will be thrilled by any murders he commits. She also claims that the Stranger is a low-level government clerk. Having seemingly taken the Stranger's earlier claims that Jakub is meant to cleanse the world as true, he kills his mother and disperses the crowd. He then returns home where he kills his step-brother, mercy kills his sister (who had been horribly beaten by their blood-thirsty half-brother), and burns down his family house.

Enraged, Jakub returns to his best friend's home and kills his friend in a duel. Zakonnica helps a delirious Jakub flee into the woods where they are encountered once more by the Stranger. The Stranger demands Jakub sign a document identifying all his former friends and family as conspirators against the king and crediting the Stranger with bringing the conspiracy down (this seems to confirm the Mother's claims that the Stranger is indeed a man working for the government). The Stranger says he had to expose Jakub to the truth about his family and friends or else he never would have given them up. Jakub agrees to sign only if the Stranger can tell him if the world has beauty in it or if it is all corrupt. The Stranger says the world is beautiful (and portrays his feelings about the world through dance). After Jakub signs the document, the Stranger fatally shoots him in the head and takes Zakonnica.

The pair journey to some Prussian soldiers where the Stranger hands them the documents signed by Jakub. The soldiers criticize the Stranger as immoral, pay him for his work, and mock his efforts to corrupt Jakub's soul. Enraged but unable to defeat the soldiers, the Stranger attacks and starts raping Zakonnica. She uses the opportunity to steal the Stranger's straight-razor and castrates him. The Stranger turns into a wolf (suggesting he really was the Devil after all) and dies from his wounds. The film ends with Zakonnica standing victorious over the canine-corpse of the Stranger.

Cast
 Wojciech Pszoniak as The Stranger/Diabel
 Leszek Teleszyński as Jakub
 Małgorzata Braunek as Narzeczona
 Iga Mayr as matka Jakuba
 Wiktor Sadecki as Herz
 Michal Grudzinski as Ezechiel
 Maciej Englert as Hrabia
 Monika Niemczyk as Zakonnica

Release

Home media
The film was released on DVD by Polart on October 23, 2007.

Reception

Sean Leonard from HorrorNews.net gave the film a mostly positive review, commending the film's cinematography, and acting, while also noting that the film didn't make a ton of sense. Jeremiah Kipp from Slant Magazine offered the film similar praise, writing, "Society for Zulawski is just a thin veneer used to disguise the horrible sadism and unhappiness lurking inside every human heart. The Devil would make for maudlin, depressing viewing if every scene didn’t feel like explosions were being set off, sending the inmates of a madhouse free into the streets outside."

References

External links
 
 
 
 

1972 films
Polish historical films
1970s Polish-language films
Films directed by Andrzej Żuławski
Films set in Poland
Films shot in Poland
Films set in the 1790s
1970s historical films